ZIL Karatel  is a family of Russian multi-functional, modular, armoured, mine resistant MRAP vehicles.

Versions
Can be used as reconnaissance, command and staff vehicles, machinery of EW or communications, ambulance or to conduct engineering, radiation, chemical and biological reconnaissance or transportation. It is based on the Kamaz-4911.

See also
Kamaz Typhoon
Ural Typhoon

Notes

External links 

Wheeled armoured fighting vehicles
Wheeled armoured personnel carriers
Armoured fighting vehicles of Russia
ZiL vehicles
Military vehicles introduced in the 2010s
Armoured personnel carriers of the post–Cold War period